Andrei Aleksandrovich Nikolayev (born 30 August 1982) is a former Russian professional footballer.

Club career
He made his debut in the Russian Premier League in 2002 for FC Zenit St. Petersburg, and played 1 game, scoring 1 goal in the UEFA Cup 2002–03 for them. In 2006, he was loaned to FK Rīga, playing in the Latvian Higher League. In 2011, he came back to Latvia, signing a contract with Skonto Riga.

Honours
 Russian Premier League runner-up: 2003.

References

1982 births
Footballers from Saint Petersburg
Living people
Russian footballers
Association football forwards
FC Zenit Saint Petersburg players
FC Moscow players
FK Rīga players
FC Salyut Belgorod players
FC Sibir Novosibirsk players
FC Volgar Astrakhan players
Skonto FC players
FC Novokuznetsk players
FC Sheksna Cherepovets players
Russian Premier League players
Russian expatriate footballers
Expatriate footballers in Latvia
Russian expatriate sportspeople in Latvia
FC Nizhny Novgorod (2007) players
FC Zenit-2 Saint Petersburg players